Fuxingmen station can refer to:
Fuxingmen station (Beijing Subway), a metro station in Beijing, China
Fuxingmen station (Tianjin Metro), a metro station in Tianjin, China